

History  

Kadambanallur is a village located in Vellore District of Tamil Nadu. Part of the people were the settlers from Chennai (Madras) who migrated during the freedom struggle in 1950.

Occupation 

The main occupations are agriculture, pottery, and skilled masons. Agriculture is done year round and includes paddy, groundnut, vegetables (mainly bringal, lady finder, and cucumber), offlate flowers (includes marigold, rose, hibiscus, jasmine, and firecracker). 
 
 It is about 60 km from west of Chennai, 10 km from south of Arakkonam, and 25 km from north of Kanchipuram. Takkolam railway station is nearby railway station.

Kadambanallur belongs to Mangattucherri Punchayat.  People celebrate "Chithirai Festival" at may month of every year.

Schools 
Government High School
Punjayat Union Middle School

Library 
Kadambanallur Library

Temples 
Vinayagar Temple
Sri Prasanna Venkatesha Perumal Temple
Ponniamman Temple
Chandiragiri Amman Temple
Jalagandeshwarar Temple
Padavattam Amman Temple

External links
 

Villages in Vellore district